The Parlier Post was a newspaper that covered Parlier, California area .  Founded in 1983, the Post ceased its publication in 2018 citing rising production costs and lower advertising revenues. 

The newspaper was owned by Mid Valley Publishing, Inc. and was a community publication of the Reedley Exponent, a weekly newspaper with a circulation of 3,400.

History 
The first reference of to a newspaper titled "Parlier Post" in Fresno County dates back to 1952. This Parlier Post was founded in 1952 by W. J. Anderson and sold one year later to James W. Fairweather, owner of the Reedley Exponent. The Library of Congress published a page associated with this historical Parlier Post.

In 2016, Amy Wu of the post-1983 Parlier Post won an honorable mention for a Gruner Award for Public Service in the category of Public Service for her story “School district takes heat over misdeeds and misdemeanors.”

References 

Defunct newspapers published in California